Richard Cawthorn Starr (August 24, 1924 – February 3, 1998) was an American phycologist.

Awards 
Richard C. Starr was the inaugural recipient of the Darbaker Prize from the  Botanical Society of America in 1955
and the recipient of the Gilbert Morgan Smith Medal in 1985.

Taxa named in honor of Richard C. Starr 
 Starria gen. nov. (Cyanophyta, described by N. J. Lang. J. Phycol. 13(1977):288-96.
 Chlorococcum starrii sp. nov. (Chlorophyta, described by F. R. Trainor and P. A. Verses. Phycology 6(1967):237-39.
 Cystomonas starrii, transferred by H. Ettl and G. Gartner. Nova Hedwigia 44(1987):509-17.
 Pleodorina starrii, sp. nov. (Chlorophyta), described by H. Nozaki, FD Ott, and AW Coleman. Journal of Phycology 42(2006):1072-1080. doi: 10.1111/j.1529-8817.2006.00255.x.

Works 
 Starr, R.C., Marner, F.J. and Jaenicke, L. (1995). Chemoattraction of male gametes by a pheromone produced by female gametes of chlamydomonas. Proc. Natl. Acad. Sci. U.S.A. 92, 641–645.

References

External links 
 Richard C. Starr at the National Academies Press
 Annette W. Coleman and Jeffrey A. Zeikus, "Richard C. Starr", Biographical Memoirs of the National Academy of Sciences (2001)
 Memorial to Richard C. Starr at the University of Texas at Austin

American phycologists
1924 births
1998 deaths
20th-century American botanists